Stève Regis Mvoué (born 2 February 2002) is a Cameroonian professional footballer who plays as a midfielder for Belgian club Seraing.

Club career
Mvoué joined the youth academy of Azur Star Yaoundé when he was 6. On 4 July 2019, he signed a pre-agreement with Toulouse to join the side on his 18th birthday in February 2020.

On 20 January 2021, Mvoué made his professional debut in a 1–0 Coupe de France win over Chamois Niortais.

On 7 September 2022, Mvoué signed a two-year contract with the Belgian Pro League club Seraing.

International career
Mvoué is a youth international for Cameroon, and was named the Best Player was at the 2019 Africa U-17 Cup of Nations. He represented the senior Cameroon national team in a 2–1 friendly win over Zambia on 9 June 2019.

Personal life
Mvoué's mother Marie Mvoué was a Cameroonian international footballer, and his brother Stéphane Zobo is also a footballer. They were teammates at Toulouse.

Honours 
Toulouse
 Ligue 2: 2021–22

Cameroon U17
 Africa U-17 Cup of Nations: 2019
Individual

 Africa U-17 Cup of Nations Player of the Tournament: 2019

References

External links
 
 

2002 births
Footballers from Yaoundé
Living people
Cameroonian footballers
Cameroon youth international footballers
Cameroon international footballers
Association football midfielders
Toulouse FC players
R.F.C. Seraing (1922) players
Ligue 2 players
Championnat National 3 players
Belgian Pro League players
Cameroonian expatriate footballers
Cameroonian expatriate sportspeople in France
Expatriate footballers in France
Cameroonian expatriate sportspeople in Belgium
Expatriate footballers in Belgium